Eberhard Mehl (20 April 1935 – 29 March 2002) was a German fencer. He won a bronze medal in the team foil event at the 1960 Summer Olympics.

References

External links
 

1935 births
2002 deaths
German male fencers
Olympic fencers of the United Team of Germany
Fencers at the 1960 Summer Olympics
Fencers at the 1964 Summer Olympics
Olympic bronze medalists for the United Team of Germany
Olympic medalists in fencing
Medalists at the 1960 Summer Olympics
Sportspeople from Cologne